Asia Business Report is a business news programme produced by the BBC and is shown on BBC World News during the Asian morning hours. This programme used to be available exclusively in Asia-Pacific, South Asia and Middle East but, as of a 1 February 2010 revamp, is aired worldwide. It is also currently aired on the UK's domestic BBC News and BBC One channel three times daily in the early hours of the morning as part of the Newsday programme. Due to COVID-19 pandemic, Asia Business Report is only followed on BBC World News at 2330 GMT, 0030 GMT, and 0130 GMT.

It is broadcast from the BBC's bureau which is in Singapore's central business district. The main presenter is Karishma Vaswani.

Presenters

Former presenters

External links
 (BBC World News)

2000s Singaporean television series
2010s Singaporean television series
2020s Singaporean television series
2003 Singaporean television series debuts
BBC television news shows
BBC World News shows
British television news shows
Business-related television series